Bryan Fletcher may refer to:

 Bryan Fletcher (rugby league) (born 1974), Australian former rugby league footballer
 Bryan Fletcher (American football) (born 1979), American football player
 Bryan Fletcher (skier) (born 1986), American Nordic combined skier

See also
Brian Fletcher (disambiguation)